Ganna Smirnova (from Kyiv, Ukraine) is the professional dance exponent and research scholar of Bharatanatyam (form of Indian classical dance), and a disciple of Guru Smt Jayalakshmi Eshwar. She is also the founder and the Art Director of Indian Theater Nakshatra in Kyiv. She is one of the leading exponent of Indian classical dance "Bharatanatyam" in the eastern Europe and performs and teaches extensively.

She is a post-diploma graduate of Institute of Fine Arts "Abhinayaa – Aaradhana", New Delhi, where she learned under Guru Jayalakshmi Eswar under the ICCR scholarship. She has learned under her Guru under the Guru- shishya Parampara for more than six years. She is one of the very few non-Indian artists who have been empaneled under the ICCR. Her performances have received positive reviews from dance critics both in India and abroad.

Early life and training
Since childhood, Ganna has been studying ballet and the Ukrainian national dance under the direction of the well-known dancer, soloist ensemble of Virsky of Lilya Melnichenok. As a student she studied eastern philosophy and practiced yoga, Tai-zi-chuan and Shigun. She is the successful Graduate of Jurisprudence from her alma mater Tarasa Shevchenko National University in her academic life and has gone on to defend her PhD from the same university. 

In 1998, Ganna received the scholarship under (Indian Council for Cultural Relations) of India to study Indian classical dance Bharatanatyam in New Delhi, while in India she received positive reviews from legendary dance critic Subuddu, Mrs. Leela Venkatraman and Dr Sunil Kothari. 

For the five years that she was in India (1998–2003), she had the intensive learning of Bharatanatyam and practiced the Carnatic Vocal music under Guru Vasantha Sundaram and Chhau under Guru Janmey jai Sai Babu. Besides she did get introductory knowledge of Kuchipudi under Guru Seetha Naagjyothi in Delhi Tamil Sangam for a couple of years. Yet Bharatnatyam remained her first and foremost passion and she was always very active with all the creative activities of her Guru while learning under her and took part in ballet compositions of her guru, and the lectures and demonstrations, and also regularly performed solo concerts in Delhi and other cities of India.

Career
Having returned to Kyiv in 2003, Ganna established a theatre of Indian dance, Nakshatra,  at T. G. Shevchenko University. Nakshtra theatre has been ceaselessly working for the promotion of Indian art and culture in Ukraine and a very high level of understanding between these two countries. Ganna was keen to make a serious cultural awareness about India in Ukraine and her past eight years have been ceaselessly dedicated for this effort. With the closest co-operation and help she created many firsts in this field. Indian Theater Nakshatra conducts lessons of Indian classical dances and yoga, organizes festivals of the Indian classical dance and music, an exhibition of painting of the Indian and Ukrainian artists, lecture- demonstrations and master classes of famous gurus, performance of students, directs students for studying Indian arts in India, carries out lectures and trainings in other cities of Ukraine. A brief history of Ganna work in this field is chronologically mentioned as such.

Establishment of the Nakshatra theatre in the year 2003, in the year 2004 The Indian dance drama Devadarpana was launched in the Musical theatre in Ukraine.

On 13–15 April 2005, Ganna with the help of the embassy of India in Ukraine and the Indian community organized the first international festival of Indian classical dances named Nrityaanjali. the artists came from numerous countries and it was first of its kind in the whole of the CIS region. She invited more than 30 amateur groups comprising more than 200 in number to go through the lecture demonstration and workshop by these artists and scholars and witness the performances of the dancers from Russia, India, Ukraine, Sweden, the Netherlands, Singapore, France presenting the mastery of their efforts in this evening. The event was organized in Operetta theatre of Kyiv.

In 17–19 May 2006, the second edition of the Nrityaanjali festival was organized and participants came from more than seven countries. The first lady of Ukraine Katherina Yuschenko as well as a galaxy of distinguished audience sat mesmerized for this great festival of India that was a marathon of three days. The festival that Nakshatra organized was coupled with the painting exhibition as well as the scientific seminar conducted in the T.G. Shsevchenko national university of Ukraine. The great legend of Indian music Pt. Chaurasia and Pt. Bhajan Sopori were kind enough to come and perform for this evening. The event was organized in the Operetta theatre of Kyiv.

On 24 October 2006, the United Nations foundation day Nakshatra Theatre organized the musical dialogue of cultures presenting Ustad Aashish Khan and Ronu Majumdar in the Operetta Theatre. The event was organized by the Operetta theatre of Kyiyv. This activity has won laurels from the friends and onlookers alike.

In the year 2009, the great maestro of Indian classical music Pt. Hari Prasad Chaurasia was invited on the celebration of the traditional Indian new year the program was so aptly named "The wind supreme". The event was organized in the National Philharmonic Hall in Kyiv. 

In the month of December 2009 the great musician and master of Sarod Ustad Amjad Ali Khan came to Kyiv and with the help of Indian Council for Cultural Relations and the Embassy of India in Ukraine, Ganna's Nakshatra Theatre a great cultural evening in the National Opera Theatre of Ukraine on 8 December. Before that, Ustad Amjad Ali Khan and his illustrious sons came to the University where they were facilitated by the head of the University and was awarded the MEDAL OF HONOR, thus being so the very first Asian musicians for getting such distinction. Ganna Smirnova has just written a book on the subject of Indian temple classical dances "Indian temple dance – Tradition, legends and Philosophy". It is the first of its kind in the whole of CIS region and has been very much appreciated by the scholars and academicians for the depth and the quality of the work that is being conducted by her work.

In March 2010, Ganna embarked on her performing tour to India and had sterling performances in the India International Center 3 March, Azad Bhawan of ICCR on 5 March and on the celebration of the International Women's day on 8 and 9 March in Jawaharlal Nehru University. She went on to perform in Natyanjali festival the Chidambaram dance festival in the pious Maha Shivarathri day on 13 March in the world-famous Natraja Thillai temple, in Kumbhakonam on 15 March, and in the Brihadiswarar temple on 17 March 2010 on the celebration of the 1000 years of the temple establishment, a rare honor for a European artiste to perform in such places. In the month of August 2010 she was invited by the Indian Cultural Center of Moscow for the presentation of her book "Indian temple dances – Tradition, Philosophy and legends" besides the recitals at the overflowing auditorium. The event was inaugurated by the Deputy head of Indian Mission in Russia at that time. Considering her work in past Ganna has been honored by the Ministry of Culture of Ukraine and her dance ensemble Nakshatra has been awarded as the national ensemble category.

PERFORMANCES: 
She has been invited to perform in the major leading festivals of India and abroad and has done both her Guru and her country proud by receiving outstanding reviews both from the audience as well as from the critics in ample measure. In India she has practically criss-crossed the entire country and has performed from the western India (Ahmadabad) to eastern India (Imphal) and from the northern city of Chandigarh to Southern city of Pondicherry. 

Ganna Smirnova has participated in the leading dance festivals of India, such as Mahabalipuram dance festival, Modhera Dance Festival, Taj Mahotsava, Rajgir Dance Festival, Uday Shankar Dance Festival, Natyanjali dance Festival in Chidambaram and Thanjavur, Bharath Kalachar dance festival, Dasyam festival amongst others.

She has been invited to perform by the leading cultural institutions and Sabhas of Tamil Nadu  to present her solo dance recital in the cities including Bangalore, Baroda, Mysore, Jaipur, Chandigarh, New Delhi, Kolkata, Panjim, Varanasi, Patna, Hyderabad, Chennai, Thanjavur, Chidambaram Thiruvananthapuram, Bhopal, Guwahati, Bhuvaneswar, and Imphal. She also danced at highly prestigious venues in Berlin, Moscow, London, Lisbon, Milan, Colombo, Kandy and Prague.

References

External links

In English
http://www.narthaki.com/info/reviews/rev258.html – Cached
 Ganna Smirnova website
 Ganna Smirnova: Mesmerized by the beauty of Bharatanatyam
 http://www.indianexpress.com/columnist/leherkala/
https://web.archive.org/web/20110513092414/http://www.kutcheribuzz.com/ebrochures/Ganna-smirnovo/default.htm

External links in Ukrainian and Russian languages
 http://sd.org.ua/news.php?id=6800
 https://web.archive.org/web/20120316145156/http://www.nakshatra.org.ua/videolinks.html
 http://www.zagran.kiev.ua/article.php?new=298&idart=2987
 https://web.archive.org/web/20120331092028/http://www.trainyou.lv/raznoe/perviy-mezhdunarodniy-festival-klassicheskogo-indiyskogo-tantsa-nrityaanzhali-kiev-2005
 http://www.sich.zp.ua/index.php?option=com_content&view=article&id=4611:2011-06-23-07-25-27&catid=38:kultura&Itemid=53
 https://web.archive.org/web/20120331092035/http://b-b-c.com.ua/exp.php?type=1&ni=4014
 https://web.archive.org/web/20111004175352/http://play.ukr.net/videos/show/key/82ad8c59949f16483b8ce55de591de24/
 http://www.religion.in.ua/zmi/foreign_zmi/7945-indijskij-tanec-yeto-produkt-mistiki-meditativnyj-duxovnyj-opyt.html
 http://afisha.zp.ua/koncerty/vecher-indiyskogo-khramovogo-tanca_894.html
 https://web.archive.org/web/20120331092048/http://middlename.ru/2006-05-10-311271.html
 http://edinstvennaya.ua/view/1636/
 http://www.liveinternet.ru/community/indiandance/post14945736/
 http://mycityua.com/news/health/2008/06/05/120809.html,print=1
 http://portmone.name/prochee/indijskie-hramovye-tancy-i-sanskrit-v-svjashchennom-zaporozhe.html
 https://web.archive.org/web/20100113164032/http://mycityua.com/articles/health/2008/06/05/120809.html
 http://portmone.name/portmone/2010/nomer-ot-5.10.10/dyhanie-indii-v-zaporozhe.html
 http://www.yapishu.com/iskusstvo-i-kultura/molitva-v-dvizhenii.html
 http://wn.com/Ganna_Smirnova
 http://www.liveinternet.ru/community/lj_nakshatra_dance/post88215169/
 http://vedavrata.livejournal.com/665791.html#comments

Living people
Dancers from Kyiv
Ukrainian female dancers
Dance teachers
Ukrainian expatriates in India
Bharatanatyam exponents
Year of birth missing (living people)